Dangsing may refer to: 
Dangsing, Bagmati, Nepal
Dangsing, Dhading, Nepal; see Dhading District
Dangsing, Gadaki, Nepal